Storahtelling is a New York City based Jewish non-profit organization with the goal of advancing Jewish literacy by bringing the tools of theater and stagecraft to bear on traditional Jewish texts and stories. The organization trains professionals and lay leaders in its methodology, offers classes for adults, and performs in rituals, ceremonies, and staged dramas at synagogues and community institutions around the world.

Mission and history
Storahtelling was established in 1999 by Amichai Lau-Lavie, a Jewish mythologist, educator and performance artist. In its early years, Storahtelling was a theater troupe, but by 2008, it had articulated a methodology for studying Jewish source texts and integrating study with Jewish rituals. The Maven Method, as that methodology became known, emerged as the organizing principle for Storahtelling's future activities, and turned it from a theater troupe into a education and training institute. 

In 2013 Storahtelling launched Lab/Shul, which organizes and hosts experimental events centered around Jewish community and learning.

In addition to performances at synagogues or Jewish community centers, the group has also performed at theaters and nightclubs.

The Maven Method draws from the ancient tradition of Torah reading alternating with a translation in the local language.  Storahtelling Mavens learn to translate not just the words of the Torah, but also the social and historical contexts of the stories of the Torah into contemporary terms. Intensive Torah study is also involved, to understand the spiritual meaning and weight of the text.

Programs
The Maven Method uses performances and training programs to revive the Torah Service in local communities for audiences of all denominations and ages.

Raising the Bar  is a program that reclaims and reshapes the B'nai Mitzvah experience for the wider, mostly unaffiliated Jewish community, by infusing it with the Storahtelling methodology. 

StorahStage are fully staged theatrical performances, touring internationally, focusing on biblical narratives through a modern lens.

External links 
Official Website
An Article about Storahtelling in Time Out New York (defunct link)
An article about Storahtelling from Israeli GLOBES magazine (defunct link)

References 

Theatrical organizations in the United States